Nahim Khadi (Born 1948, Freetown) is a former Sierra Leonean international football star and the current president of the Sierra Leone Football Association. He was elected to the position in 2004, after defeating his closest rival, Joseph Samba Kelfala during the 2004 election.  He was born to Sierra Leonean-Lebanese parents.

Khadi  played for Sierra Leone national football team known as  the Leone Stars during the sixties and seventies and also turned out for five local clubs including the country's two biggest and most popular clubs, East End Lions and Mighty Blackpool. Nahim Khadi is also one of the first Sierra Leonean people of full Lebanese origin to represent Sierra Leone at any sport.

On the 20th of July 2008 he was re-elected as president of the Sierra Leone Football Association

His son is international player Nahim Khadi, Jr.

External links

1948 births
Living people
Sierra Leonean footballers
Sportspeople from Freetown
Sierra Leonean people of Lebanese descent
Sportspeople of Lebanese descent

Association footballers not categorized by position